California Hall may refer to:

 California Hall (San Francisco, California)
 California Hall (UC Berkeley)

See also 
 California Hall of Fame
 Hall, California